Barbra Streisand is an American actress and singer. Her discography consists of 117 singles, 36 studio albums, 11 compilations, 11 live albums, and 15 soundtracks. According to the Recording Industry Association of America, Streisand is the second-best-selling female album artist in the United States with 68.5 million certified albums in the country, (the only female in the top ten and only artist outside the rock 'n' roll genre) and a total of 150 million records sold worldwide, making her one of the best-selling music artists

With 52 gold and 31 platinum albums, Streisand exceeds all other female singers and all other recording artists other than Elvis Presley. She is the only female artist to have achieved fourteen multi-platinum albums, including the soundtrack for her film A Star Is Born. Her recordings have earned her eight Grammy Awards and the Grammy's Lifetime Achievement Award and Legend Award. According to Billboard, Streisand holds the record for the female with the most number one albums (11). Billboard also recognizes Streisand as the greatest female of all time on its Billboard 200 chart and one of the greatest artists of all time on its Billboard Hot 100 chart. She has had No. 1 albums in each of the last six decades, a record not matched by any other artist. Her 2014 Columbia Records album, Partners became her tenth No. 1 album. With a total of 34 Billboard Top 10 albums to her credit since 1963, Streisand holds the records for the most Top 10 albums by a female artist and for the widest span (52 years) between first and latest Top 10 albums by a female recording artist. Her albums Higher Ground (1997), Back to Broadway (1993), Love Is the Answer (2009), Partners (2014) and Encore: Movie Partners Sing Broadway (2016) all entered the Billboard 200 album chart at No. 1.

She has achieved five No. 1 singles in the US, and is also one of the few acts with top 10 hits in four different decades. In 1974, "The Way We Were" became the first original single by a female artist to achieve the No. 1 song of the year in US. "Woman in Love" from Guilty is one of the best-selling singles of all time in France.

In 1964, Streisand became the first and only female artist to place three albums in the top 10 on Billboard'''s annual albums chart. Five Streisand albums appeared on the Billboard 200 album chart on October 31, 1964, Streisand held the record for the female with the most albums in the Top 200 simultaneously for nearly half a century, until Whitney Houston had ten albums place in the Billboard 200 chart at the same time after fans learned of her death. In 1982, "Memories" became the UK's best-selling album of the year (where it was released as Love Songs), the first album by a female performer to achieve it. During March 5–19, 1977, Streisand became the first female singer to have a No. 1 album (A Star Is Born) and single (Evergreen (Love Theme from A Star Is Born)) in the same week in the US. Streisand's biggest-selling album, Guilty (1980), was a collaboration with Barry Gibb of the Bee Gees and sold over 12 million copies worldwide as well as spawning several hit singles. In the UK, she became the first female solo artist to have a No. 1 album (Guilty) and single ("Woman in Love") in the same week. 25 years later, Streisand and Gibb teamed up again to create Guilty Pleasures, known as Guilty Too'' in some countries.

Albums

Studio albums

Live albums

Compilation albums

Cast recordings and soundtrack albums

Featuring albums

Singles

1960s

1970s

1980s

1990s

2000s

2010s

As featured artist

Notes

Music videos

Video releases

Notes

References

External links
 
 
 
 

Barbra Streisand
Discographies of American artists
Pop music discographies